The Towson Tigers men's lacrosse team represents Towson University in National Collegiate Athletic Association (NCAA) Division I college lacrosse. The coach is currently Shawn Nadelen, who is in his fifth year at that position. The team plays its home games in Johnny Unitas Stadium. Towson has competed in the Colonial Athletic Association for lacrosse since 2002, with the conference tournament format commencing in 2003. Previously being a member of the East Coast Conference and the America East Conference. The team's principal rivals are the Loyola Greyhounds, though the team has other significant series with Maryland and Johns Hopkins.

History

The program first started at the varsity level in 1958. Since then, the team has a cumulative record of 433–326, combined DI and DII. Towson has made 21 NCAA Tournament appearances.

Towson won the NCAA Division II Men's Lacrosse Championship in 1974 defeating Hobart 18–17 in overtime, in the very first Division II championship tournament. Overall, the Tigers have made 14 NCAA tournaments.

In the 1991 NCAA tournament, under coach Carl Runk, Towson recorded their first NCAA Division I tournament victory, defeating Virginia, 14–13. That season, they went on to also defeat Princeton and Maryland, before falling to North Carolina in the championship game, 18–13. In the 2001 edition of the tournament, Towson reached the Final Four, defeating Duke and Maryland, before losing to Princeton, 11–12.

In the 2013 NCAA Division I Men's Lacrosse Championship, Towson upset NCAA tournament seed Penn State to gain the Colonial conference title, losing in the first round 16–6 to #3 seed Ohio State. Also the Tigers won 10–8 in the play-in game, followed by a close 12–10 loss to eventual finalist Notre Dame in 2015.

In the 2019 season, Towson reached the #1 ranking in all three major NCAA Lacrosse polls for the first time in the school's history as a Division 1 school.

Notable players and coaches
 Casey Cittadino
 Matt Eckerl
 Dick Edell
 Kyle Fiat
 Spencer Ford
 Rob Shek

Season results
The following is a list of Towson's results by season since the institution of NCAA Division I in 1971:

{| class="wikitable"

|- align="center"

†NCAA canceled 2020 collegiate activities due to the COVID-19 virus.

References

External links
 

NCAA Division I men's lacrosse teams
Towson Tigers men's lacrosse
1958 establishments in Maryland
Lacrosse clubs established in 1958
College men's lacrosse teams in the United States